Aulus Caecina the son of Aulus Caecina, was an Ancient Roman writer.

He took the side of Pompey in the civil wars, and published a violent tirade against Caesar, for which he was banished.  He recanted in a work called Querelae, and was pardoned by Caesar following the intercession of his friends, above all, Cicero, who defended him in 69 BC with the speech Pro Caecina.

Caecina was regarded as an important authority on the Etruscan system of divination (Etrusca Disciplina), which he endeavoured to place on a scientific footing by harmonizing its theories with the doctrines of the Stoics.

Considerable fragments of his work (dealing with lightning) are to be found in Seneca (Naturales quaestiones, ii. 31–49). Caecina was on intimate terms with Cicero, who speaks of him as a gifted and eloquent man and was no doubt considerably indebted to him in his own treatise De Divinatione. Some of their correspondence is preserved in Cicero's letters (Epistulae ad Familiares vi. 5–8; see also ix. and xiii. 66).

References

Senators of the Roman Republic
Golden Age Latin writers
Ancient Roman politicians
Etruscan religion
Correspondents of Cicero
1st-century BC Romans
1st-century BC writers
Latin writers known only from secondary sources
Ancient Roman exiles
Severus, Aulus